Leshchenko is a surname of Ukrainian origin.

This surname is shared by the following people:

 Lev Leshchenko (born 1942), Russian singer
 Pyotr Leshchenko (1898–1954), singer in the Russian Empire and later the Soviet Union, "the King of Russian Tango"
 Serhiy Leshchenko (born 1980), Ukrainian journalist and public figure
 Vyacheslav Leshchenko (born 1995), Russian professional ice hockey right winger

See also
 

Ukrainian-language surnames